The Vionène is a small river that flows through the Alpes-Maritimes department of southeastern France. It flows into the Tinée in Saint-Sauveur-sur-Tinée.

References

Rivers of France
Rivers of Alpes-Maritimes
Rivers of Provence-Alpes-Côte d'Azur